Megasoma is a genus of rhinoceros beetles. Commonly known as the elephant beetles, Megasoma species are found from the southern half of North America to most of South America.

Appearance
Megasoma are generally large in size (as indicated by the name, which is "large body" in Greek).  As a group, the genus contains some of the largest beetle species known. However, there are small species of this genus as well. The largest can be up to 135 mm, while small ones like Megasoma punctulatum can be around 20 mm.

Many Megasoma species (Megasoma elephas, Megasoma thersites, Megasoma gyas, Megasoma cedrosa, Megasoma anubis, Megasoma occidentale, Megasoma joergenseni, Megasoma vogti) have thin microscopic hairs (setae) covering nearly their entire bodies, giving the appearance of being pale or orange.

Males of most species have large horns that they use to wrestle with other males. Females do not have horns.

Diet
Larvae feed on tree or shrub roots. Adults usually drink tree sap or suck juice from fruit.

Behavior and habitat
Adult Megasoma are nocturnal and are attracted to lights, and are often seen resting in trees.

Species list
Megasoma actaeon (Linnaeus, 1758)
Megasoma anubis (Chevrolat, 1836)
Megasoma bollei (Dechambre, 2006)
Megasoma cedrosa Hardy, 1972
Megasoma elephas (Fabricius, 1775)
Megasoma gyas (Herbst, 1785)
Megasoma hermes Prandi, 2016
Megasoma hyperion Prandi, Grossi & Vaz-de-Mello, 2020
Megasoma joergenseni Bruch, 1910
Megasoma lecontei Hardy, 1972
Megasoma mars (Reiche, 1852)
Megasoma nogueirai Morón, 2005
Megasoma occidentale Bolivar, Pieltain, Jimenez-asua & Martinez, 1963
Megasoma pachecoi Cartwright, 1963
Megasoma punctulatum Cartwright, 1952
Megasoma rex Prandi, 2018* (considered a likely synonym of M. actaeon - see)
Megasoma sleeperi Hardy, 1972
Megasoma svobodaorum Krajcik, 2009
Megasoma thersites LeConte, 1861
Megasoma typhon (Olivier, 1789)
Megasoma vazdemelloi Prandi, 2018
Megasoma vogti Cartwright, 1963

See also
 List of largest insects

References

Kirby, W. 1825. A description of such genera and species of insects, as alluded to in the "Introduction to Entomology" of Messrs. Kirby and Spence, as appear not to have been before sufficiently noticed or described. Transactions of the Linnean Society of London, 14: 563–572. Internet Archive [original description: p. 566]
Schoolmeesters P. 2017. Scarabs: World Scarabaeidae Database (version Jul 2016). In: Roskov Y., Abucay L., Orrell T., Nicolson D., Bailly N., Kirk P., Bourgoin T., DeWalt R.E., Decock W., De Wever A., Nieukerken E. van, Zarucchi J., Penev L., eds. 2017. Species 2000 & ITIS Catalogue of Life, 30 January 2017. Digital resource at www.catalogueoflife.org/col. Species 2000: Naturalis, Leiden, the Netherlands. ISSN 2405-8858. Reference page.
2019 winter Bekuwa No.70 Megasoma group

Dynastinae
Scarabaeidae genera
Taxa named by William Kirby (entomologist)